Eucereon setosa is a moth of the subfamily Arctiinae. It was described by Sepp in 1830. It is found in Mexico, Guatemala, Panama, Venezuela, Suriname and Bahia, Brazil.

References

setosa
Moths described in 1830